Zgierz  is a city in central Poland, located just to the north of Łódź, and part of the metropolitan area centered on that city. As of 2021 it had a population of 54,974.

Zgierz is situated in the Łódź Voivodeship (since 1999); previously it was in Łódź Metro Voivodeship (1975–1998). It's the capital of Zgierz County.

History

Zgierz is one of the oldest cities in central Poland. The oldest known mention of Zgierz comes from 1231, when two dukes of fragmented Piast-ruled Poland, Władysław Odonic of Greater Poland and Konrad I of Masovia, held a meeting there. Zgierz acquired its town rights some time before 1288, and those rights were renewed by Polish King Władysław II Jagiełło in 1420. In 1494, King John I Albert exempted the town from taxes for 10 years, and in 1504, King Alexander Jagiellon established three annual fairs. Zgierz was a royal town of Poland, administratively located in the Łęczyca Voivodeship in the Greater Poland Province of the Polish Crown.

During the joint German-Soviet invasion of Poland, which started World War II, on September 3 and 5, 1939, Zgierz was raided by Germany, and captured on September 6. Already in September 1939, the Germans committed first atrocities against Poles and carried out executions of Polish civilian defenders. Inhabitants of Zgierz were also among Poles murdered in nearby Łagiewniki on September 12 and in Retki on September 16. As part the Intelligenzaktion, Germans carried out large massacres of Poles from the region in the nearby forests of Łagiewniki and Lućmierz, killing hundreds and thousands of people respectively. Germans also carried out expulsions of Poles and deported over 8,000 people to forced labour to Germany. Some were also killed in Nazi concentration camps, including the interwar director of the local State School of Economics, Jakub Stefan Cezak, and local Protestant parish priest, Aleksander Falzman. Schools were closed, factories were looted, Polish monuments were destroyed. Despite this, the Polish underground resistance movement was active in Zgierz.

Before the war, Zgierz had a thriving Jewish community of around 4,000, which formed 16,6% of the town's populace as of 1931. When the Germans occupied the town, they began persecuting the Jews, with the assistance of local ethnic Germans. The synagogue was burned and Jews were kidnapped from the streets for forced labor. Many tried to flee the town, though some of these returned. In December, 1939, the Germans deported 2500 of the Jews to Głowno in the General Gouvernment, German-occupied central Poland. Left behind were fewer than 100 Jews, mostly craftsmen thought to be useful to the Germans. In 1942, these Jews were deported to the Łódź Ghetto. This history is unusual in that no mass killings in Zgierz were reported. Of course, the Jews deported to Łódz and Głowno were caught up in the fate of those communities, and most were later deported to the Treblinka extermination camp. As many as 350 Jewish residents of Zgierz survived the war, but did not return to the town.

On March 20, 1942, the Germans carried out a public execution of 100 Poles in the town, who were then buried in Lućmierz-Las. A memorial was erected at the site of the massacre after the war. Around 50 Poles from Zgierz took part in the Warsaw Uprising in 1944. In total over 7,600 inhabitants of Zgierz died under German occupation, which ended in January 1945.

Town limits were expanded in 1954, 1959, 1988.

Sports
It competes in the lower leagues.

Twin towns – sister cities

Zgierz is twinned with:

 Bischwiller, France
 Glauchau, Germany
 Hódmezővásárhely, Hungary
 Jihlava, Czech Republic
 Kežmarok, Slovakia
 Kupiškis, Lithuania
 Manevychi Raion, Ukraine
 Orzysz, Poland
 Supraśl, Poland

Panorama

References

External links
 City of Zgierz
 www.miastozgierz.pl - Independent Portal

Cities and towns in Łódź Voivodeship
Zgierz County
Piotrków Governorate
Łódź Voivodeship (1919–1939)